Charles Thomas Cleveland (born March 10, 1956) is a retired United States Army Lieutenant General who was the commander of the United States Army Special Operations Command (2012–2015). He is a graduate of the United States Military Academy, class of 1978. He previously served as commanding officer of the US Army 10th Special Forces Group from 2001 to 2003 where he led the initial invasion into northern Iraq during Operation Iraqi Freedom. He served as Chief of Staff, and as Deputy Commander of the Army Special Operations Command followed by duty as commander of Special Operations Command South from 2005 to 2008. Cleveland served as Special Operations Command Central from 2008 to 2011. He retired from the U.S. Army in August 2015.

Awards and decorations

References

External links

1958 births
Living people
United States Army generals
Recipients of the Distinguished Service Medal (US Army)